Like It Is: Yes at the Bristol Hippodrome is a live album and video by English progressive rock band Yes, released on CD, DVD, and Blu-ray on 8 December 2014 by Frontiers Records. It is their first live album featuring keyboardist Geoff Downes and lead vocalist Jon Davison in the band, after joining the group in 2011 and 2012, respectively.

It documents Yes's performance at the Bristol Hippodrome on 11 May 2014 on their first Album Series Tour, which featured Close to the Edge (1972), Going for the One (1977), and The Yes Album (1971) performed in their entirety and in track order, although Close to the Edge is not included. A sequel album and video, Like It Is: Yes at the Mesa Arts Center, featuring Close to the Edge and Fragile (1971), was released in 2015.

Overview 
Like It Is: Yes at the Bristol Hippodrome is a partial recording of the Yes show on 11 May 2014 at the Bristol Hippodrome as a part of their 2013–14 Three Album Tour. The recording features only two of the albums, Going for the One (1977) and The Yes Album (1971) played live in their entirety. Thus, the Close to the Edge album is missing.

It is the band's first live album featuring lead vocalist Jon Davison and keyboardist Geoff Downes in the band's line-up. Downes previously featured on three tracks of the 3-CD set The Word Is Live, released in 2005.

A sequel, titled Like It Is: Yes at the Mesa Arts Center and featuring the albums Close to the Edge and Fragile was released in July 2015.

Critical reception 

In a positive review for AllMusic, Matt Collar rated Like It Is: Yes at the Bristol Hippodrome three-and-a-half stars out of five and said that "this is an epic live experience that finds Yes celebrating its classic '70s sound".

Track listing

Personnel 
Yes
Jon Davison – lead vocals, acoustic guitar, percussion, keyboard
Steve Howe – electric and acoustic guitars, backing vocals
Chris Squire – bass guitar, backing vocals
Geoff Downes – keyboards
Alan White – drums, percussion

Production
Patrick Shevelin – recording
Billy Sherwood – mixing
Maor Appelbaum – mastering
Chris Squire – mixing assistance
Jon Davison – mixing assistance
Jerry & Lois Photography – photography
Roger Dean – painting
Giulio Cataldo – booklet editor and layout

References

External links
 

2014 live albums
Albums with cover art by Roger Dean (artist)
Frontiers Records live albums
Yes (band) live albums
Yes (band) video albums